Gherăești is a commune in Neamț County, Western Moldavia, Romania. It is composed of three villages: Gherăești, Gherăeștii Noi and Tețcani.

At the 2002 census, 100% of inhabitants were ethnic Romanians. 89% were Roman Catholic and 10.7% Romanian Orthodox.

Natives
 Petru Gherghel

References

Communes in Neamț County
Localities in Western Moldavia